Albert E. Dunkley (1877–1949) was an English professional footballer. An outside left, he played in the Football League for Leicester Fosse (1900; eleven appearances), Blackburn Rovers (1903; four appearances, one goal) and Blackpool (1906; 15 appearances, three goals).

References

1877 births
1949 deaths
Footballers from Northampton
English footballers
Leicester City F.C. players
Northampton Town F.C. players
Blackburn Rovers F.C. players
Blackpool F.C. players
Gillingham F.C. players
English Football League players
Association football forwards